Café con piernas (Spanish for "coffee with legs") is a coffee shop style popular in Chile where the service staff are all or nearly all attractive women dressed in clothing considered revealing.  Coffee shops with waitresses serving in miniskirts and heels to businessmen had long been popular, but bikinis and similar attire accelerated the trend by the mid-1990s.   The shops are very numerous and popular in Santiago.  It is frequently noted that the shops seem to contradict Chile's traditionally conservative culture.  

Generally, the women walk on a raised catwalk behind the bar so as to maximize the view for patrons.  Not all locations feature women in bikinis or lingerie: some have stayed with the traditional miniskirt and heels.

See also
 Bikini barista (similar phenomenon in the northwestern United States)
 Betel nut beauty (Taiwan)
 Host and hostess clubs, Maid café, and No-pan kissa (Japan)
 Breastaurant

References

Chilean culture
Types of coffeehouses and cafés
Sexualization
Gendered occupations